The 2006 Missouri Valley Conference men's basketball tournament was played from March 2-5, 2006 at the Savvis Center in St. Louis, Missouri at the conclusion of the 2005–06 NCAA Division I men's basketball regular season. The Southern Illinois Salukis won their 5th MVC tournament title to earn an automatic bid to the 2006 NCAA tournament.

Tournament Bracket

See also
 Missouri Valley Conference

References 

2005–06 Missouri Valley Conference men's basketball season
Missouri Valley Conference men's basketball tournament